Bakke is a Norwegian surname that may refer to
Allan Bakke (born 1940), American anaesthesiologist
Arve Bakke (born 1952), Norwegian trade unionist
Bill Bakke (born 1946), American ski jumper
Bo Bakke (born 1955), Norwegian curler
Brenda Bakke (born 1963), American actress
Christine Bakke (born 1971), American LGBT activist
Dagfinn Bakke (1933–2019), Norwegian artist
E. Wight Bakke (1903–1971), American sociologist and economist
Egil Bakke (born 1927), Norwegian civil servant
Frank Bakke-Jensen (born 1965), Norwegian politician
Eirik Bakke (born 1977), Norwegian football player
Gunnar Bakke (born 1959), Norwegian politician from the Progress Party and mayor of Bergen
Hallvard Bakke (born 1943), Norwegian politician for the Labour Party 
Holly Bakke, American attorney
Johnny Bakke (1908–1979), Norwegian politician
Kit Bakke (born 1946), American activist who promoted for women's rights
Ole Bakke (1889–1925), Norwegian-American architect
Morten Bakke (born 1968), Norwegian football goalkeeper
Randi Bakke (1904–1984), Norwegian figure skater
Ruth Bakke (born 1947), Norwegian organist and composer
Svein Bakke (1953–2015), Norwegian football player
Svein Erik Bakke (1947–2006), Norwegian entrepreneur
Trine Bakke (born 1975), Norwegian alpine skier

See also
Bakkes

Norwegian-language surnames